David "Dai" Evans (born 19 June 1934) is a former Welsh footballer who played as a goalkeeper.

Career
Evans began his career in 1955 at Welsh club Llandudno, before signing for Crewe Alexandra in the 1956–57 season. Evans made 48 Football League appearances during his time Crewe, before signing for Chelmsford City.

References

1934 births
Living people
Association football goalkeepers
Welsh footballers
People from Colwyn Bay
Sportspeople from Conwy County Borough
Llandudno F.C. players
Crewe Alexandra F.C. players
Chelmsford City F.C. players
English Football League players